The Elkhorn Guard Station, also known as the Elkhorn Ranger Station, comprises four buildings in the backcountry of Olympic National Park, Washington. The station was built by the U.S. Forest Service between 1930 and 1934, before the establishment of the national park, when the lands were part of Olympic National Forest (USFS). The structures were designed in the Forest Service's interpretation of the National Park Service rustic style, using native materials and construction  techniques. The complex was built using labor from the Public Works Administration and the Civilian Conservation Corps. The Elkhorn Guard Station is one of five surviving USFS-built guard stations.

The chief structure is the residence, built in 1933 to replace a smaller cabin that had previously served as the guard station. The  by  cabin is built of peeled logs on a stone foundation with a gable roof. One end of the roof overhangs at the gable to form a porch supported by log posts. A shed roof on the opposite elevation shelters the front door. An woodshed was built nearby in 1934, of frame construction. The log barn was relocated in 1996 due to changes in the course of the nearby Elwha River. An open-fronted shelter was constructed in the early 1930s, one of six built at the time, and the only survivor. The  square shelter is saltbox-shaped with a wood floor and built-in bunk beds. The shelter was relocated at the same time as the barn.

The Elkhorn Guard Station was listed on the National Register of Historic Places on July 13, 2007.

References

Ranger stations in Olympic National Park
Buildings and structures in Clallam County, Washington
Rustic architecture in Washington (state)
Civilian Conservation Corps in Washington (state)
Park buildings and structures on the National Register of Historic Places in Washington (state)
United States Forest Service ranger stations
Historic districts on the National Register of Historic Places in Washington (state)
National Register of Historic Places in Clallam County, Washington
1934 establishments in Washington (state)
National Register of Historic Places in Olympic National Park